Kommareddi or Kommareddy is one of the Indian surnames:

 Kommareddy Savithri, famous Indian actress.
 Kommareddi Suryanarayana, an Indian Parliamentarian.